Him Law Tze-yat (born Law Chung-him on 28 August 1984) is a Hong Kong actor currently contracted to TVB.

Law began his acting career by starring as supporting characters in several well-known films, most notably in Mob Sister (2005), which was also Law's debut film. He later began filming for several internet and television dramas, later receiving a Best Supporting Actor nomination at the TVB Anniversary Awards in 2008 for his performance in the sports drama Your Class or Mine.

Early life
Law was born to a simple Hakka family in the New Territories. As his parents were divorced when he was young, he was brought up by his uncle who did not have any children. He has an older sister who is two years older than him. His father is a hair stylist, his mother is a make-up artist, and his older sister is a piano teacher.

Law attended  where he was a member of the basketball and association football teams. He was devoted to sports—he would go to basketball practice everyday after school and football practice every weekday night. On weekends, he would hang out in football courts during the day and basketball courts at night. When Law was 16, he worked as a part-time lifeguard.

Following his Form 5 graduation in 2001, he briefly worked as a lifeguard at a private swimming venue in Villa Esplanada, Tsing Yi Island, using the money he earned to study stress and rescue diving at the Happy Valley Athletic Association. In 2004, Law earned the annual Lifeguard Award. Seeing that being a lifeguard earns little income and is unsuitable to be a lifelong career, Law planned to attend a fire academy to become a firefighter. However, he decided against it and prepared himself for attending a police academy instead.

Career
Law was discovered by a film producer from Hong Kong's Filmko Films Distribution while accompanying a female friend to a casting audition. At that time, Law was already thinking of changing jobs and was preparing to attend a police academy. Curious for a career in acting, Law signed a management and acting contract with Filmko with the support from both his family and friends. Law debuted in the 2005 Hong Kong action film Mob Sister as the boyfriend of Annie Liu's character. He soon began starring in various other Hong Kong films as supporting roles, many in which he starred as the love interest of Elanne Kong's characters.

After starring in several internet dramas produced by RTHK, Law began filming for television dramas produced by TVB to "brush up his acting." Although Dressage To Win was Law's first drama to broadcast on television, he first filmed the 2008 sports comedy-drama Your Class or Mine, starring opposite Bobby Au-yeung and Sheren Tang. Law portrayed Fan Pui-tung, a high school football player, and received a Best Supporting Actor nomination at the 2008 TVB Anniversary Awards.

According to Law, filming for television dramas was difficult as he only gets two to four hours of sleep daily, but he exclaimed that it was a good way to improve his acting. Law received critical praise and broader recognition through his performance in the 2009 comedy crime drama D.I.E. Again.

He portrayed Jim Shu-bong ("James Bond"), a young and tech-smart investigator working for the D.I.E. investigation unit of the police department.

Law was later cast to portray Joe Ma's younger brother in the romantic comedy drama Suspects in Love, produced by Poon Ka Tak. Law's character, Ken, is a college-graduate thai boxing trainer. To prepare for his role, Law devoted half a year in the gym, training for two hours straight. To achieve a sunny tanned look, Law consistently stayed in the sun for over two hours.

Personal life
Law was in an on–off relationship with singer and actress Theresa Fu from January 2010 to July 2011. In August 2011, Fu publicly accused Law of physical abuse. Photos of her bruises were also made public. Law apologized in a press conference for his actions and admitted that there was a fundamental lack of trust in the relationship.

Law began a relationship with actress Tavia Yeung after collaborating in the television drama The Hippocratic Crush in 2011. After five years of dating, they held a private wedding ceremony at Leeds Castle in Kent, England in March 2016. They held another wedding ceremony in Hong Kong in October 2016 and registered for marriage. Together, Law and Yeung have a daughter and a son, born respectively in 2020 and 2021.

Filmography

Film

Television series

Others

Awards and nominations

References

External links
 
 Him Law at TVB Blog

1984 births
Living people
TVB actors
21st-century Hong Kong male actors
Hong Kong male film actors
Hong Kong male television actors
Hong Kong people of Hakka descent
Indigenous inhabitants of the New Territories in Hong Kong